Lost in Forever is the second studio album by the German symphonic metal band Beyond the Black. It was released on February 12, 2016 on Airforce1 Records and We Love Music. This is the first album to feature all six band members instead of studio and guest musicians.

Track listing

Personnel
Beyond the Black
 Jennifer Haben – lead vocals
 Nils Lesser – lead guitar & backing vocals
 Christopher Hummels – rhythm guitar & backing vocals
 Erwin Schmidt – bass
 Tobias Derer – drums
 Michael Hauser – keyboards

Guest musicians
 Rick Altzi (Masterplan) – guest vocals on "Beautiful Lies"
 Herbie Langhans (Beyond the Bridge, Sinbreed) – guest vocals on "Rage Before the Storm"

Production
Hartmut Krech, Mark Nissen, Hannes Braun – producers, engineers and mixing on tracks 1, 2, 4, 6, 7 and 8
Sascha Paeth – producer on tracks 3, 5, 10, 11, 13 to 17, engineer and mixing on tracks 3, 5, 9 to 17
Thorsten Brötzmann – producer on tracks 9 to 12 
Ivo Morig – producer on tracks 9 and 12
Sascha Bühren – mastering of tracks 1-13 at TrueBusiness Studios, Berlin, Germany
Michael 'Miro' Rodenberg – mastering of tracks 14-17 at GateStudio, Wolfsburg, Germany

Charts

References

External links
https://web.archive.org/web/20151222134224/http://www.metalunderground.at/news/beyond-the-black-albumcover-und-tracklist-zu-lost-in-forever

2016 albums
Beyond the Black albums